O. hilli  may refer to:
 Oliva hilli, a sea snail species
 Ophiacodon hilli, a large pelycosaur whose fossils were found in Joggins, Nova Scotia, Canada

See also
 Hilli (disambiguation)